HC Litvinov, called HC VERVA Litvínov for sponsorship reasons is an ice hockey team in the Czech Extraliga. Their home arena is Ivan Hlinka Stadion in Litvínov.

Honours

Domestic
Czech Extraliga
  Winners (1): 2014–15
  Runners-up (1): 1995–96

Czechoslovak Extraliga
  Runners-up (3): 1977–78, 1983–84, 1990–91
  3rd place (3): 1981–82, 1989–90, 1991–92

2nd. Czechoslovak Hockey League
  Winners (1): 1958–59

Pre-season
Tipsport Hockey Cup
  Winners (1): 2002

Players

Current roster

Club names
 1945 – Sportovní klub Stalinovy závody Horní Litvínov
 1954 – Jiskra SZ Litvínov
 1962 – CHZ (Chemické závody) LITVÍNOV
 1990 – HC (Hockey club) CHZ Litvínov
 1991 – HC Chemopetrol Litvínov
 1994 – HC Litvínov, s. r. o.
 1996 – HC Chemopetrol, a. s.
 2007 – HC Litvínov
 2009 – HC BENZINA Litvínov
 2011 – HC VERVA Litvínov

Players
 See :Category:HC Litvínov players for a list of HC Litvínov players past and present.

References

External links

 Official website 

Litvinov
Litvinov
Most District
Ice hockey clubs established in 1945
1945 establishments in Czechoslovakia